Henry Smith (February 10, 1766June 28, 1818) was the fifth Governor of Rhode Island from October 15, 1805 to May 7, 1806.

Smith was born in Providence in the Colony of Rhode Island and Providence Plantations.  He was educated in Providence, and became a successful merchant.  He served as an officer in the militia, and attained the rank of colonel in a Providence County unit known as the Providence Independent Light Dragoons.

As a result of his business success, in the early 1800s Smith constructed a mansion at Smith and Davis Streets on Smith Hill in Providence.  Known as the Colonel Henry Smith House, it stood until the early 1920s, when it was razed to allow for construction of an annex for the Rhode Island State House.

Elected to the Rhode Island Senate in 1803, he was the leader of the senate or "first senator" when Governor Arthur Fenner died.  Lieutenant Governor Paul Mumford had died before Fenner, so as first senator Smith succeeded to the governorship.

He died on June 28, 1818 and was buried at North Burial Ground in Providence.

References

External links

Sobel, Robert, and John Raimo, eds. Biographical Directory of the Governors of the United States, 1789-1978, Vol. 4. Westport, CT: Meckler Books, 1978. 4 vols.

1766 births
1818 deaths
Governors of Rhode Island
Country Party (Rhode Island) state governors of the United States
Rhode Island state senators
Burials at North Burying Ground (Providence)
People of colonial Rhode Island
Politicians from Providence, Rhode Island